Yrjö Sinkkonen (9 July 1909, Parikkala – 5 October 1972) was a Finnish farmer and politician. He was a Member of the Parliament of Finland from 1954 to 1962 and again from 1966 to 1972, representing the Agrarian League, which renamed itself the Centre Party in 1965.

References

1909 births
1972 deaths
People from Parikkala
People from Viipuri Province (Grand Duchy of Finland)
Centre Party (Finland) politicians
Members of the Parliament of Finland (1954–58)
Members of the Parliament of Finland (1958–62)
Members of the Parliament of Finland (1966–70)
Members of the Parliament of Finland (1970–72)